Phragmataecia laszloi is a species of moth of the family Cossidae. It is found on Annapurna Himal in Nepal.

References

Moths described in 2009
Phragmataecia